The following article presents a summary of the 1996 football (soccer) season in Brazil, which was the 95th season of competitive football in the country.

Campeonato Brasileiro Série A

Quarterfinals

|}

Semifinals

|}

Final

Grêmio declared as the Campeonato Brasileiro champions by aggregate score of 2-2.

Relegation
The two worst placed teams, which are Fluminense and Bragantino, were relegated to the following year's second level.

Campeonato Brasileiro Série B

União São João declared as the Campeonato Brasileiro Série B champions.

Promotion
The two best placed teams in the final stage of the competition, which are União São João and América-RN, were promoted to the following year's first level.

Relegation
The three worst placed teams in all the five groups in the first stage, which are Central, Sergipe and Goiatuba, were relegated to the following year's third level.

Campeonato Brasileiro Série C

Quarterfinals

|}

Semifinals

|}

Final

Vila Nova declared as the Campeonato Brasileiro Série C champions by aggregate score of 3-1.

Promotion
The champion and the runner-up, which are Vila Nova and Botafogo-SP, were promoted to the following year's second level.

Copa do Brasil

The Copa do Brasil final was played between Cruzeiro and Palmeiras.

Cruzeiro declared as the cup champions by aggregate score of 3-2.

State championship champions

Youth competition champions

Other competition champions

Brazilian clubs in international competitions

Brazil national team
The following table lists all the games played by the Brazil national football team in official competitions and friendly matches during 1996.

Women's football

Brazil women's national football team
The following table lists all the games played by the Brazil women's national football team in official competitions and friendly matches during 1996.

The Brazil women's national football team competed in the following competitions in 1995:

Domestic competition champions

References

 Brazilian competitions at RSSSF
 1996 Brazil national team matches at RSSSF
 1996 Brazil women's national team matches at RSSSF

 
Seasons in Brazilian football
Brazil